Brigitte Barèges (born 1 May 1953 in Toulouse) is a member of the National Assembly of France. She represents the Tarn-et-Garonne department, The Republicans.

She is mayor of Montauban since March 2001. She was reelected for a second term on 16 March 2008, then for a third term on 30 March 2014.

Barèges sparked a controversy when she voiced brusque opposition to proposals for legalized same-sex marriage: "Why not let people marry animals, too?"

Barèges sparked a controversy when she described a black person of her party as "humain stain".

Barèges was punished by French courts because she refused to celebrate the wedding of a foreign couple.

On 17 February 2014, the prosecutor announces that it will conduct an investigation for embezzlement of public funds. Despite this challenge on the judicial front, on 30 March 2014, Barèges won the municipal elections in Montauban for a third term. During the summer of 2014, CNCCFP rejects the accounts for the municipal elections. On 21 October 2014, following the rejection of her campaign accounts, Barèges was condemned to one year of ineligibility and non-reimbursement of campaign expenses by the Administrative Court of Toulouse. The court mentioned the use of municipality funds to fund an illegal advertising campaign during the election.

On 9 February 2021, she is condemned to an 18 months prison suspended sentence, a 15 000 € fine and five years of ineligibility with immediate effect. Therefore, she is not mayor of Montauban anymore from that same day.

References

External links
 Official website 

1953 births
Living people
Politicians from Toulouse
Rally for the Republic politicians
Union for a Popular Movement politicians
Deputies of the 12th National Assembly of the French Fifth Republic
Deputies of the 13th National Assembly of the French Fifth Republic
The Social Right
Modern and Humanist France
The Popular Right
Mayors of places in Occitania (administrative region)
Women mayors of places in France
20th-century French women politicians
21st-century French women politicians
Women members of the National Assembly (France)